Arthur O'Connor (1 October 1844 – 30 March 1923), was an Irish politician and Member of Parliament (MP) in the Parliament of the United Kingdom of Great Britain and Ireland from 1880 to 1900.

He was elected to the House of Commons as MP. for Queen's County at the 1880 general election, until the constituency was divided at the 1885 general election.

He then contested both the new Queen's County Ossory seat and East Donegal for the Irish Parliamentary Party in 1885 and was elected for both.  He chose to sit for East Donegal.

He was elected as an Anti-Parnellite MP in the 1892 general election, holding that seat through the 1895 general election for Donegal East until the 1900 general election when as a QC., he was defeated standing as an Healyite Nationalist for Donegal North.

Notes

References

External links 
 

    
    
    

    
    
    

    
    
    

1844 births
1923 deaths
Irish Parliamentary Party MPs
Anti-Parnellite MPs
Healyite Nationalist MPs
Members of the Parliament of the United Kingdom for Queen's County constituencies (1801–1922)
UK MPs 1880–1885
UK MPs 1885–1886
UK MPs 1886–1892
UK MPs 1892–1895
UK MPs 1895–1900
Members of the Parliament of the United Kingdom for County Donegal constituencies (1801–1922)